Lal Bihari Tiwari (born 30 November 1941) is an Indian politician from Delhi. He was member of Bharatiya Janata Party.

Positions held
 General Secretary, Mandal Ghonda, Bharatiya Jan Sangh President, Mandal Ghonda, Jan Sangh 
 Mantri Vice-President and President, BJP, District Shahdara
 1993-June 1997:  Member, Delhi Legislative Assembly 
 December 1993-June 1997: Minister, Food and Supply, Government of Delhi
 1997: Elected to Lok Sabha in a By Poll (Eleventh)
 1998: Elected to 12th Lok Sabha (2nd term)
 1999: Elected to 13th Lok Sabha (3rd term)

References

East Delhi (Lok Sabha constituency)
http://www.elections.in/delhi/assembly-constituencies/east-delhi.html

Living people
1941 births
India MPs 1996–1997
India MPs 1998–1999
India MPs 1999–2004
People from Pratapgarh district, Uttar Pradesh
Lok Sabha members from Delhi
People from East Delhi district
Bharatiya Janata Party politicians from Delhi
Bharatiya Jana Sangh politicians